A Growl Towel is the colloquial name used to refer to the rally towels given to fans prior to National Basketball Association (NBA) playoff games involving the Memphis Grizzlies.

Origin
The original Growl Towels were given out from 2004 to 2006, when the Grizzlies made three straight playoffs . However, the Grizzlies were swept by their opponents in all three appearances, so only six different towels were made. The Grizzlies failed to make the playoffs for the next four seasons, so the Growl Towel was shelved.

2004 Playoffs

Round 1

2005 Playoffs

Round 1

2006 Playoffs

Round 1

2011 Playoffs

Round 1

Western Conference semifinals

2012 Playoffs

Round 1

2013 Playoffs
Starting with the 2013 Playoffs, the growl towels started to feature different captions in each game, in addition to the traditional "Believe Memphis" towel. The Nashville Company called ''Something Inked'', which specialises in custom promotional products, produces a new growl towel for each playoff game.

Round 1

Western Conference Semifinals

Western Conference Finals

2014 Playoffs

Round 1

2015 Playoffs

Round 1

Western Conference Semifinals

2016 Playoffs

Round 1

2021 Playoffs

Play-In

Round 1

2022 Playoffs

Round 1

Western Conference Semifinals

References

Sports paraphernalia
Memphis Grizzlies